The Broadcast Company of the Americas, traded as  BCA Radio was a broadcasting company based in the San Diego, California area.

BCA Radio no longer operates any radio stations after losing its operational leases.

The Viejas Band of Kumeyaay Indians, which owns and operates Viejas Casino, owned 50% of BCA.

BCA only programmed the stations, whose concessions and transmitters are owned by Mexican entities; until 2014, Mexican regulations prohibited the ownership of stations based in Mexico by foreign companies.

References

External links 
Hoovers.com - Broadcast Company of the Americas

Kumeyaay
Defunct broadcasting companies of the United States
Defunct radio broadcasting companies of the United States
Companies based in San Diego